Igor Velichkin (born 3 July 1987) is a Russian professional ice hockey forward. He is currently player of HC 19 Humenné who most recently played for Amur Khabarovsk of the Kontinental Hockey League (KHL).

Velichkin made his KHL debut with Traktor Chelyabinsk during the inaugural 2008–09 KHL season.

References

External links
 

1987 births
Living people
Amur Khabarovsk players
Avtomobilist Yekaterinburg players
HC Kunlun Red Star players
HC Lada Togliatti players
Metallurg Magnitogorsk players
Metallurg Novokuznetsk players
Russian ice hockey forwards
Traktor Chelyabinsk players
HC Vityaz players
People from Magnitogorsk
Sportspeople from Chelyabinsk Oblast